Katina Hodson-Thomas (born 28 April 1957) is an Australian politician who was a Liberal member of the Western Australian Legislative Assembly representing the electorate of Carine after winning the seat in the 1996 election. She was subsequently re-elected to the seat in 2001 and 2005 but retired just before the 2008 election.

Born in Norwood, South Australia, a suburb of Adelaide, South Australia, she was educated at the local high school before leaving to arrive in Western Australia in 1987.

In January 2008, Hodson-Thomas announced that she would retire from politics at the end of her term. She left the party as a result of a bitter leadership feud between Paul Omodei and then-leader Troy Buswell, and after Buswell had made inappropriate sexist comments to her in front of a large number of male colleagues, for which Buswell later apologised. She went on to remark that the state parliament was a boys' club and the male members need to lift their standards.

Her successor in Carine was Tony Krsticevic who won pre-selection and then the seat in the 2008 election.

References

1957 births
Living people
Members of the Western Australian Legislative Assembly
Liberal Party of Australia members of the Parliament of Western Australia
Politicians from Adelaide
21st-century Australian politicians
21st-century Australian women politicians
Women members of the Western Australian Legislative Assembly